U.S. National Championships may refer to;
 United States national amateur boxing championships
 United States Figure Skating Championships
 U.S. National Championships (tennis), before 1968, the tennis tournament now called the U.S. Open
 USA Gymnastics National Championships
 USA Outdoor Track and Field Championships